Mike Jenkins (born March 22, 1985) is a former German-born American professional American football cornerback. He played college football for the University of South Florida and was recognized as an All-American. He was selected by the Dallas Cowboys in the first round of the 2008 NFL Draft. He has also played for the Oakland Raiders, Tampa Bay Buccaneers, and Arizona Cardinals.

Early years
Jenkins was born in Neuenburg am Rhein, Baden-Württemberg, West Germany;  his mother was a computer operator with the United States Army stationed in West Germany and left the Army when Jenkins was five. Jenkins's mother separated from his father in 1990, moved to Florida, and divorced in 1995, when he was ten.

Jenkins played high school football as a safety and running back at Southeast High School, receiving Class 3A all-state and Sarasota Herald-Tribune Defensive Player of the Year honors. He also lettered in track and field.

College career
While attending the University of South Florida, Jenkins played for the South Florida Bulls football team and also ran track. He became a starter as a sophomore, registering 38 tackles, 2 interceptions, 5 passes defensed, and 2 forced fumbles. The next year, he recorded 27 tackles, 15 passes defensed, one interception and was named second-team Big East.

In 2007, he finished with career-highs in tackles (41), interceptions (3), tackles for loss (4) and passes defensed (16). He was a first-team Big East Conference selection and received first-team All-American honors from the American Football Coaches Association.

He finished his college career with 133 tackles (6 for loss), a school-record 47 passes defensed, 6 interceptions and 5 forced fumbles. He was also a kickoff returner, scoring on a 100-yard return as a senior.

Professional career

Dallas Cowboys

2008 season
The Dallas Cowboys traded up with the Seattle Seahawks moving from the 28th to the 25th position, in exchange for a fifth ((#163-Owen Schmitt) and seventh ((#235-Brandon Coutu) round draft choices, in order to select Jenkins in the first round of the 2008 NFL Draft. On July 26, he signed a $9.725 million contract with $6.75 million guaranteed, including a $3.1 million signing bonus.

He was used mainly as a slot cornerback, starting 3 of his 14 games played. He finished the season with 22 tackles (17 solo), 6 passes defensed and one interception (returned for a touchdown).

2009 season
In 2009, Jenkins and fellow cornerback Orlando Scandrick competed in training camp and in the beginning of the regular season for the starter position. In week 3 against the Carolina Panthers he registered an interception, which helped him earn the starting job over Scandrick who focused on the slot corner position. He also established himself as a coverage corner by intercepting three passes in his first few starts. In a playoff loss to the Minnesota Vikings, he was ineffective on two plays, allowing wide receiver Sidney Rice to score 2 touchdowns.

Jenkins finished the 2009 seasons with 5 interceptions (tied for 12th in the NFL),  23 passes defensed, 49 total tackles and was selected as an alternate to the 2009 Pro Bowl. He moved to the official line-up on January 25, 2010 when Minnesota Vikings cornerback Antoine Winfield withdrew due to injury.

2010 season
Jenkins recorded 55 total tackles, 15 passes defensed (led the team), 1 forced fumble, and 1 interception, while starting every game of the season.

2011 season
Jenkins suffered a neck stinger in training camp and missed the entire 2011 preseason.  He came back from the injury and started 12 games for the Cowboys (missing 4 games with a hamstring injury), including the first 7 games, in an injury-plagued season.  Jenkins fought through several injuries, including a hamstring strain, a sore shoulder and knee and a dislocated right shoulder that required off-season surgery. Overcoming the injuries, Jenkins managed to have a solid season recording 22 tackles, 10 passes defensed (led the team) and 1 interception. By fighting through injuries, he displayed toughness that had been called into question by fans and media in past seasons.

2012 season
Entering the final year of Jenkins's rookie contract (which paid him around $1.05 million), the Dallas Cowboys drafted cornerback, Morris Claiborne, with the 6th overall pick in the 2012 NFL Draft.  The presence of Claiborne added yet another talented defensive back for the Cowboys with newly signed free agent Brandon Carr and veteran Orlando Scandrick. The Cowboys selecting Claiborne sparked immediate media speculation as to his future with the team, since Scandrick had also received a contract extension and Jenkins was on the final year of his contract.

He skipped the voluntary 2012 Organized Team Activities (OTAs) while rehabbing from shoulder surgery allegedly because he was unhappy with his current contract and his place on the team's depth chart.

Jenkins was supposedly hopeful he would be traded from the Cowboys and the Indianapolis Colts allegedly showed interest in him.  The Dallas Cowboys' management repeatedly stated publicly they would not trade Jenkins and allegedly turned down several offers.  In the first day of training camp, Jenkins clarified that he did not ask the Cowboys to be traded.

Because of his contract dispute, he decided to rehab his injured right shoulder outside of the team's training facilities, which delayed his recovery time, forcing him to miss all of the 2012 off-season and preseason action. Jenkins was cleared to practice by his doctor about a week before the season opener and lost his starter job to Claiborne. He played in 13 games (2 starts), and recorded 14 tackles (10 solo) and 3 passes defensed. At the end of the season, the team did not offer Jenkins a second contract because of the investment they made in Claiborne and Carr.

Oakland Raiders

2013 season
He signed a one-year contract with the Oakland Raiders on April 8, 2013 as a free agent, after not receiving the kind of deal he was expecting. He was named the starter at left cornerback and compiled 15 starts (missed one game with a hamstring injury), 75 tackles, 8 passes defensed, and 2 interceptions (tied for the team lead).

Tampa Bay Buccaneers

2014 season
Jenkins signed as a free agent with the Tampa Bay Buccaneers on March 20, 2014. The deal was a one-year contract worth up to $1.5 million. He suffered a pectoral strain on opening day against the Carolina Panthers and was placed on the injured reserve list on September 10, 2014. He appeared in only one game during his first season in Tampa Bay.

2015 season
On March 5, 2015, Jenkins signed a one-year, $825,000 contract offer to remain with the Buccaneers, allowing him to return to compete to be a starter against Alterraun Verner and Johnthan Banks. He appeared in 14 games (5 starts), finishing with 17 total tackles and 5 pass deflections in 14 games. He was not re-signed after the season.

Arizona Cardinals

2016 season
On July 19, 2016, Jenkins signed with the Arizona Cardinals. On August 29, 2016 Jenkins tore his ACL in a preseason game against the Houston Texans and was placed on injured reserve. He was in the mix for Arizona's starting cornerback job opposite of Patrick Peterson before the injury.

NFL career statistics

References

External links
Tampa Bay Buccaneers bio
South Florida Bulls bio

1985 births
Living people
American football cornerbacks
Arizona Cardinals players
Coffeyville Red Ravens football players
Dallas Cowboys players
German players of American football
National Conference Pro Bowl players
Oakland Raiders players
People from Breisgau-Hochschwarzwald
Sportspeople from Freiburg (region)
Players of American football from Florida
South Florida Bulls football players
Sportspeople from Bradenton, Florida
Tampa Bay Buccaneers players